Neo Sound Best (stylized as Neo SOUND BEST) is the first compilation album from the Japanese rock band UVERworld released on 9 December 2009 under gr8! records label. The album was released to celebrate 5th anniversary of their debut. The album consists of all released singles and selected tracks from studio albums, all tracks went through remastering. The first press version includes DVD disc with live performances.

It reached #2 rank daily and #3 weekly. Totally charted 30 weeks. It has also received platinum certification.

Track listing

References

2009 compilation albums
Uverworld albums
Sony Music Entertainment Japan compilation albums
Japanese-language compilation albums
Gr8! Records singles